The 341st Fighter Squadron is an inactive United States Air Force unit.  It was last assigned to the 348th Fighter Group, based at Itami Air Base, Japan. It was inactivated on May 10, 1946.

It was allocated to the New Jersey Air National Guard and redesignated as the 141st Fighter Squadron on May 24, 1946.

History

Lineage
 Constituted 340th Fighter Squadron on September 24, 1942
 Activated on September 30, 1942
 Inactivated on to May 1946.

Assignments
 348th Fighter Group, September 30, 1942 – May 10, 1946

Stations

 Mitchel Field, New York, September 30, 1942
 Bradley Field, Connecticut, September 30, 1942
 Westover Field, Massachusetts, October 30, 1942
 Hillsgrove AAF, Rhode Island, January 23, 1943
 Westover Field, Massachusetts, April 26 – May 9, 1943
 Jackson Airfield (7 Mile Drome), Port Moresby, New Guinea, June 23, 1943
 Finschafen Airfield (Dreger Field), New Guinea, December 13, 1943
 Saidor Airfield, New Guinea, March 13, 1944
 Wakde Airfield, Wakde, Netherlands East Indies, May 26, 1944
 Kornasoren (Yebrurro) Airfield Noemfoor, Netherlands East Indies, August 24, 1944
 Tacloban Airfield, Leyte, Philippines, November 30, 1944
 Tanauan Airfield, Leyte, Philippines, December 14, 1944
 San Marcelino Airfield, Luzon, Philippines, February 4, 1945
 Floridablanca Airfield (Basa Air Base), Luzon, Philippines, c. May 15, 1945
 Ie Shima Airfield, Okinawa, July 9, 1945
 Kanoya Airfield, Japan, September 9, 1945
 Itami Airfield, Japan, c. October 20, 1945 – May 10, 1946.

Aircraft
 P-47 Thunderbolt, 1942–1945
 P-51 Mustang, 1945.

Operational history
Combat in Southwest and Western Pacific, July 30, 1943 – August 15, 1945.

References

 

Fighter squadrons of the United States Army Air Forces
Fighter 0341
Military units and formations established in 1942
Military units and formations disestablished in 1946